S. montana may refer to:

Sarcopteryx montana, an Australian rainforest tree
Saurauia montana, a tree of the Chinese gooseberry family
Schistura montana, a stone loach
Scutellaria montana, mountain skullcap, a plant of the deadnettle family
Sozusa montana, a moth of the family Erebidae
Sphegina montana, a hoverfly of the family Syrphidae
Stagmomantis montana, a praying mantis
Stigmella montana, a moth of the family Nepticulidae
Sycacantha montana, a moth of the family Tortricidae
Syssphinx montana, a moth of the family Saturniidae